Sólo Para Mujeres (Just For Women in Spanish) is a Mexican theatre play. It has been running for about a decade. This show was inspired by the 1997 British film Full Monty.

Sólo Para Mujeres came after the success of its predecessor, Sólo Para Hombres (Just for Men), a play that starred Lorena Herrera, among others, and which came about after Herrera's participation in the famous telenovela, Dos Mujeres, un Camino. Sólo Para Hombres featured Herrera and other famous Mexican actresses dancing on stage with scant outfits. Sólo Para Mujeres followed the same lines: muscular actors would dance, for an audience that consists mainly of women, wearing underwear only or suggestive clothing.

Although Televisa is not directly connected with the play, many of the actors on Sólo Para Mujeres have had previous experience acting in soap operas for the largest Mexican television network. Among those are Alexis Ayala, Jorge Salinas, Sergio Sendel, Alfonso de Nigris and the play's producer, Sergio Mayer. Former Menudo Johnny Lozada also participated at the play for a number of years.

The play was not expected to be as successful as Sólo Para Hombres was: Mexico, as with most of Latin America, still has a society with relatively machista views, and so the first expectations for Sólo Para Mujeres were that it would last, at most, a couple of years. The play managed, however, to outlast Sólo Para Hombres.

Cast of the Characters

Timbiriche
 Benny Ibarra as himself
 Erik Rubin as himself
 Sasha Sokol as herself
 Mariana Garza as herself
 Paulina Rubio as herself
 Diego Schoening as himself
Menudo
 Charlie Massó
 Johnny Lozada
 Ricky Meléndez
 René Farrait
 Ray Reyes
 
El Señor de los Cielos & Falsa Identidad Cast
 Fernanda Carrillo as Mònica Robles 
 Guy Ecker aa Joe Navarro
 Francisco Gattorno as Gustavo Casasola
 Eduardo Yañez as Don Mateo Corona
 Sergio Goyri as Gavino Goana
 Azela Robinson as Ramona 
La Piloto Cast
 Mauricio Aspe as Arley Mena 
 Lisardo as Vasily Kilichenko 
 Tommy Vásquez as Arnoldo Santamaría 
Mi Marido Tiene + Familia & Una Familia Con Suerte Cast
 Silvia Pinal as Imelda Sierra de Córcega 
 Rafael Inclan as Eugenio Córcega 
 René Casados as Audifaz Córcega 
 Marco Muñoz as Tulio Córcega 
 Gaby Platas as Ampola Polita Casteñeda 
 Carmen Salinas as Crisanta Díaz 
 Emilio Osorio as Aristóteles Córcega 
 Joaquín Bondoni as Cuauhtémoc "Temo" López 
 Laura Viganti as Daniela Córcega 
 Pablo Lyle as Pepe 
 Marcos Montero as Ignacio Meneses 
 Jessica Coch as Marisol Córcega 
 Yahir as Xavi Galán 
 Fedrico Ayos as 
 Gonzalo Vega Jr. as Axel Legorreta Córcega
 Lola Merino as Ana Romano
 Germán Bracco as Guido 
 Azúl Guaita as Yolotl Rey 
 José Pablo Alanís as Andy Rey 
 José Manuel Alanís as Santi Rey 
 Juan Diego Covarrubias

Sin Senos Sí Hay Paraíso Cast
 Carolina Galtán as Catalina Marín 
 Robert Manrique as Santiago Sanín 
 Javier Jattin as Tony Campana 
 Francisco Bolivar as José Luis Vargas 
 Luis Pablo Llano as Daniel Cerón
Por Amar Sin Ley Cast
 Ana Brenda Contreras as Alejandra Ponce
 Julian Gil as Carlos Ibarra
 José María Torre as Roberto Morelli
 Sergio Basañez as Gustavo Soto
 Altair Jarabo as Victoria Escalante
 Guillermo García Cantú as Alonso Vega
 Pablo Valentín as Benjamin Acosta
 Kimberly Dos Ramos as Sofía Alcócer
 Moisés Arizmendi as Alan Páez
 Geraldine Bazán as Elena Fernández
 Víctor García as Juan Lopez
 Marco Méndez as Javier Rivas

Seasons

All Stars (Season One) 

 Alexis Ayala
 Sergio Mayer
 Raúl Magaña
 Juan Carlos Casasola
 Jorge Salinas
 German Gutierrez
 Juan Carlos "Chao" Nieto
 Eduardo Rivera
 Alberto Vazquez Jr.
 Hugo Acosta
 Eduardo Rivera

Evolution (Season 2) 

 Roberto Asad
 Poncho De Nigris
 Armando Gonzalez
 Manuel Landeta
 Latin Lover
 Xavier Ortiz
 Eduardo Rodriguez
 Sergio Mayer
 Marco Mendez

Reloaded (Season 3) 

 Ferdinando Valencia
 Juan Carlos Franzoni
 Jorge Boyoli
 Tony Vela
 Pepe Gamez
 Marco Corleone
 Felipe Sánchez
 Juan Carlos "Chao" Nieto
 Clever
 Arturo Vázquez
 Latin Lover
 Sergio Mayer

Limited Edition (Season 4) 

 David Zepeda as David Ladesma
 Juan Vidal 
 Latin Lover
 Jorge Aravena
 Eleazar Gómez
 Javier Gómez
 Emmanuel Palomares
 Nacho Casano
 Juan Ángel Esparza
 
 José Carlos Farrera
 César Urena
 Rafael Nieves
 Charly López
 Raúl Coronado
 Edu Moñuz
 Ezequiel Meilutis
 Ricardo Crespo
 Marcos Montero
 Ramiro Fumazoni
 Ricardo Franco
 David Ortega

The motorcycle accident
On May 5, 2005, the production team of Sólo Para Mujeres suffered a tragedy when, during the filming of a video at a Mexico City street, a man who was allegedly driving over the speed limit drove into the scene and crashed his car against the motorcycles used by five members of the Sólo Para Mujeres play, killing actor Edgar Ponce and injuring three others.

Many among the public are clamoring for a full investigation of the incident. Among some publicly expressed doubts are the fact that the street had not been closed before the filming of the video, and also that the members of Sólo Para Mujeres were not provided with protective helmets before getting on their motorcycles. Also, driving motorcycles on the street where the tragedy happened is prohibited by the law.

Members of the play declared that it was not of their knowledge that driving motorcycles was prohibited on the particular street where the tragedy happened, because they had passed there on their bikes before and no one had admonished them for it. On the other hand, the man who drove the car into the motorcycles was released on bond until the case is seen at a Mexican court. Mayer demonstrated great displeasure when given the news that that man was not in jail anymore.

Current activities
This show is currently touring the US with presentations in Atlanta, Las Vegas, Los Angeles, Phoenix, Arizona and Miami.

References

External links
  Official site.

Entertainment in Mexico
Mexican plays
Erotic dance
Nudity in theatre and dance